Third Rock Ventures is a venture capital firm based in Boston, founded in 2007 which invests in biotechnology startups.

Approach 

Third Rock employs a four-stage approach to company creation: Discover, Launch, Build, Transform. In the Discovery phase, Third Rock works with scientific founders and expert advisors to develop a vision and strategy for a company. Once the company concept has been refined and optimized in Discovery, the firm launches the company with the necessary resources to enable it to reach critical milestones. Partners and other employees at the firm assume active roles on the company's leadership team in the interim to ensure the execution of the company's R&D strategy, and to build a world-class executive team. In the Build phase Third Rock transitions out of interim roles and establish management teams. Third Rock has invested in 60 portfolio companies; these companies are now bringing products to patients – Transforming their lives and the lives of their families. The firm's portfolio of companies has launched 18 products.

References

Notes

External links
Official Website

Financial services companies established in 2007
Venture capital firms of the United States